"Shape of My Heart" is a song by British musician Sting, released in August 1993 as the fifth single from his fourth solo album, Ten Summoner's Tales (1993). The song was co-written by guitarist Dominic Miller and features harmonica played by Larry Adler. It was used for the end credits of the 1994 film Léon, starring Jean Reno, Gary Oldman and Natalie Portman, and within the 1993 film Three of Hearts. Despite failing to reach the top 50 in the UK upon its release, it has become a pop classic and one of Sting's works most closely associated with his solo career. It has since been sampled in many tracks since its release, including "Shape" (2003) by Sugababes and "Rise & Fall" (2003) by Craig David. Ann-Margret sang a cover over the opening credits of her 1996 movie Blue Rodeo 

The song's guitar riff was also sampled by Nas for his track "The Message" in 1996 and interpolated by Juice WRLD on the worldwide hit "Lucid Dreams" (2018), on "You’re Mines Still" (2020) by rapper BLEU and in "Parkstone Drive" by Russ.

Background and writing
Sting explained that through "Shape of My Heart", he wanted to tell the story of a "card player, a gambler who gambles not to win but to try to figure out something; to figure out some kind of mystical logic in luck, or chance; some kind of scientific, almost religious law."

Sting: "We wrote a song together — “Shape of My Heart”. Dom came in with this fantastic riff — beautiful cadence, sort of Bach-like descending baseline. So we spent the morning structuring it, making it into a song. Here's a verse here and a verse there and there's a key change there. So I just go for a walk and I have it in my headphones and I just walk around. A few hours later I’ve got at least the concept of what the song is telling me, which is about a gambler. And Dom said, 'Where’d you get this shit from?' I said, 'I don’t know.' It just occurs to me but the music tells me the story."

Dominic Miller: "Well it's a huge compliment, I think. But I mean the truth behind that one is that that riff is that I just actually came up with that motif as an exercise for myself, just as a warm-up exercise based on sixth chords. And it's like that takes inspiration from, kind of from Chopin-type chords, piano chords. I was just messing around with that, kind of like the way John McLaughlin would write chord sequences. He wasn't really articulating the third so much — it's much more about the sixth is what, like, tells you what it is. And so I was just having fun with that and what I think about it is when I hear rappers and an artist using that riff, I'm kind of smiling at myself, first of all thinking that unbeknownst to them they're actually playing classical music from Europe. I can't really claim it as my own really because that's that was the source and I just reorganized that idea. And then it was Sting's imagination as a songwriter to — this is a perfect example of collaboration — he was the one who said well that is a song. And I'm going, “It’s just an exercise, mate.” And cut to he walks in the garden and comes back with a lyric, and that song was written in a day. It was just done. It didn't take three months, and sometimes songs are like that, you know? So I'm very flattered, but I don't really claim total ownership with it because I know where it came from, and it came from classical music.""

Critical reception
Alan Jones from Music Week gave the song two out of five in his review, writing, "This understated track from Ten Summoner's Tales most closely resembles "It's Probably Me". Commercially it will probably get a leg-up into the Top 40 from the addition of previously unreleased live tracks and its use as the main theme to the new William Baldwin movie Three Of Hearts."

Music video
The accompanying music video for "Shape of My Heart" was directed by Doug Nichol and premiered in September 1993. It was filmed at Sting's Lake House in Wiltshire.

Charts

Weekly charts

Year-end charts

Certifications

References

Songs written by Sting (musician)
Sting (musician) songs
1993 songs
1993 singles